Cross-country skiing at the 2016 Winter Youth Olympics was held at the Birkebeineren Ski Stadium in Lillehammer, Norway from 13 to 18 February.

Medal summary

Medal table

Events

Boys' events

Girls' events

Qualification system
Each nation could send a maximum of 4 athletes (2 boys and 2 girls). The top 7 teams of the Marc Hodler Trophy Cross-Country Skiing at the 2015 Junior Nordic World Ski Championships plus the hosts Norway were allowed to send the maximum of 4 athletes. Any remaining quota spots were distributed to nations not already qualified, with a maximum of one boy or girl from one nation. The quota limit was 90. The current allocation of quotas is listed below.

Qualification summary

References

External links
Results Book – Cross-country skiing

 
2016 in cross-country skiing
2016 Winter Youth Olympics events
2016
Youth Olympics